There are several video games in the Ninja Gaiden franchise that were released in 1991.

 Ninja Gaiden (arcade game) had a version re-released in 1991 for DOS
 Ninja Gaiden (NES video game) was released in 1991 in Europe for NES
 Its sequel Ninja Gaiden II: The Dark Sword of Chaos was released in 1991 for MS-DOS and Amiga
 Its second sequel Ninja Gaiden III: The Ancient Ship of Doom was released in 1991 for NES
 Ninja Gaiden (Game Gear) was released in 1991 for Game Gear
 Ninja Gaiden Shadow was released in 1991 in Japan and North America for Game Boy